Robert Buchanan (born Bellshill, 1887, date of death unknown) was a Scottish professional footballer active either side of the First World War.  Prior to the war, he played for Chelsea, where he made three Football League appearances.  He later played for Southend United and Gillingham, where he was a regular during the 1919–20 season.

References

1887 births
Date of death missing
Footballers from Bellshill
Scottish footballers
Gillingham F.C. players
Chelsea F.C. players
Southend United F.C. players
Bellshill Athletic F.C. players
Association football defenders